Sagar Cantonment is a cantonment town in Sagar district in the Indian state of Madhya Pradesh.

Demographics
 India census, Sagar Cantonment had a population of 35,872. Males constitute 52% of the population and females 48%. Sagar Cantonment has an average literacy rate of 72%, higher than the national average of 59.5%: male literacy is 77%, and female literacy is 66%. In Sagar Cantonment, 15% of the population is under 6 years of age.

References

Sagar, Madhya Pradesh
Cantonments of India
Cities and towns in Sagar district